"Something About You " is a song by Filipino musician Eyedress featuring Dent May, released by Lex Records on 2 June 2021 as the first single from his album Mulholland Drive (2021). The song was written and recorded by Idris Vicuña and Dent May. The single was released as a double-a-side single with "Spit On Your Grave". The video for the track was directed by Bobby Astro.

Reception
The A.V. Club noted the "unabashed '70s slow-jam camp of 'Something About You,' complete with a whispered 'so sexy'—delivered totally straight-faced", The Fader wrote "'Something About You' is a smitten indie soft-rock ballad" while Loud and Quiet noted "very little can prepare you for the sleazy French noir porno whispers of 'Dom Perignon' on the happy-go-lucky 'Something About You (feat. Dent May)'."

"Something About You" went viral in the US with Rolling Stone citing the track as the fastest-rising song on American streaming services for the week ending September 23. This was the third Eyedress single to become a viral hit in 2021 with "Jealous" and "Romantic Lover" going viral on TikTok earlier in the year. On 14 December 2021, "Something About You" charted at number thirty one on the Billboard Hot Rock & Alternative Songs chart.

Charts

Certifications

References 

2021 songs
2021 singles
Eyedress songs